Jo-Anne Nadler is a British journalist, writer, political commentator and Conservative Party politician.

Early life

Nadler studied History and Politics at the University of York, where she ran the student radio station URY and established the annual national Student Music Chart which went on to be broadcast for several years across independent radio and sponsored by Nestle.  Although intent on a career in journalism she was picked by BBC Radio 1 for a place on their production training scheme which she took up on graduating with a 2:1.

Journalism
Nadler became the first female producer that Radio 1 had recruited externally and she went on to produce The Radio 1 Chart Show and various other shows. But, in 1992 she took a post at Conservative Central Office as a senior press officer in the run up to that year's general election. She had been a Young Conservative during her teens, motivated to become politically active by her father's history as childhood refugee escaping Nazism, and welcomed the job move as a way of re-establishing her political expertise.

She returned to the BBC two years later to work as a political producer; initially this was at a regional level on the magazine programme Around Westminster, but eventually she was offered a post with the broadcaster's Sunday lunchtime political flagship, On the Record (presented first by Jonathan Dimbleby, then by John Humphrys), where she was both producer and reporter. Nadler became a freelance journalist following the Conservatives' landslide defeat at the 1997 general election. With New Labour in power she set about researching a book about the likely next leader of the Conservative Party. When confirmed as leader, William Hague, agreed to cooperate with the project although she retained editorial independence. The biography, William Hague: In his own Right was published by Politicos in 2000

Her second book Too Nice to be a Tory: Its my party and I'll cry if I want to was published by Simon and Schuster in 2005. It used the structure of a personal memoir to tell the wider story of the changing fate of the Conservative Party in the years since 1979. The book was well reviewed and brought her further work as a political commentator and author who makes regular appearances on radio and television, as well as writing for various newspapers and magazines. 

She has appeared on programmes as diverse as BBC One's Question Time, Channel 5's The Wright Stuff and BBC Radio 4's Any Questions. Written contributions include articles for The Guardian, The Scotsman and The Spectator.

Political career
On 6 May 2010, Nadler was elected to Wandsworth Borough Council as a representative of the Conservative Party. She served one term majoring on schools and licensing but stood down in 2014 to concentrate on her young family.

Personal life

Nadler's father James Nadler was a Polish Jew who became a naturalised British citizen in the 1950s and went on to senior status at the BBC World Service Radio. He died when she was 11. Her mother is a landscape painter, Hilary Nadler.

Nadler was a member of the Young Conservatives as a teenager during the early 1980s, and has spoken about how friends at the BBC found it difficult to understand her political affiliation. She recalls being described as a "Trendy Tory" by a lazy sub while never actually using the term herself .

Bibliography

 William Hague: In his own Right (2000)
 Too Nice to be a Tory: It's My Party and I'll Cry If I Want to (2004)
 David Cameron: The Regeneration Game (2007)

References

External links

1960s births
Living people
Alumni of the University of York
English women journalists
BBC newsreaders and journalists
English writers
Conservative Party (UK) officials
Conservative Party (UK) councillors
Councillors in the London Borough of Wandsworth
English women writers
British women television journalists
British radio presenters
British women radio presenters
Women councillors in England